Jeti-Ögüz (seven bulls) is a district of Issyk-Kul Region in north-eastern Kyrgyzstan. Its seat lies at Kyzyl-Suu. It comprises much of the eastern end of the Terskey Ala-Too Range.

Geography
The Terskey Alatau, Ak-Shiyrak Range, Borkoldoy Too, Jetim Bel Range, and Kakshaal Too spread across the Jeti-Ögüz District. Major valleys include Issyk-Kul Valley, Upper Naryn Valley, Ak-Shiyrak Valley, and so on. The district contains deposits of ores of tin, tungsten, copper and other metals. Among its large rivers are the Naryn, Saryjaz, Barskoon, Jeti-Ögüz, etc.

Population

Rural communities and settlements
In total, Jeti-Ögüz District includes 47 villages located in 13 rural communities. Each rural community may consist of one or several villages. The rural communities and settlements in the Jeti-Ögüz District are:
 Ak-Döbö (seat: Munduz; incl. Ak-Döbö, Ang-Östön and Tilekmat)
 Ak-Shyyrak (seat: Ak-Shyyrak; incl. Kulttsentr and Yshtyk)
 Aldashev (seat: Saruu; incl. Juuku and Ysyk-Köl)
 Barskoon (seat: Barskoon; incl. Karakol, Kara-Say and Söök)
 Darkan (seat: Darkan)
 Jargylchak (seat: Ak-Terek; incl. Jengish, Kichi-Jargylchak and Chong-Jargylchak)
 Jeti-Ögüz (seat: Jeti-Ögüz; incl. Ak-Kochkor, Jele-Döbö, Jeti-Ögüz resort, Kabak, Taldy-Bulak and Chyrak)
 Kyzyl-Suu (seat: Kyzyl-Suu; incl. Jalgyz-Örük, Kaynar and Pokrovka Pristany)
 Lipenka (seat: Lipenka; incl. Bogatyrovka, Zelenyy Gay and Ichke-Bulung)
 Orgochor (seat: Orgochor; incl. Boz-Beshik, Kurgak-Ayryk and Podgornoye)
 Svetlaya Polyana (seat: Svetlaya Polyana; incl. Chong-Kyzyl-Suu)
 Tamga (seat: Tamga; incl. Tosor)
 Yrdyk (seat: Alkym; incl. Jon-Bulak, Komsomolskoye, Konkino and Yrdyk)

References 

Districts of Issyk-Kul Region